Troy Cline (born September 12, 1969) is a former American stock car racing driver from Hawthorne, California. Cline competed in 22 NASCAR Winston West Series races between 1999 and 2001, reaching the top ten 7 times. Cline competed in 5 NASCAR Busch Series races from 2002 to 2003, his best finish being a 21st at Nazareth Speedway in 2002.

References

External links
 

Living people
1969 births
Racing drivers from California
NASCAR drivers
People from Hawthorne, California
USAC Silver Crown Series drivers

Stewart-Haas Racing drivers